In the 2000s in jazz, well-established jazz musicians, such as Dave Brubeck, Wynton Marsalis, Sonny Rollins, Wayne Shorter, Jessica Williams, Michael Franks and George Benson, continued to perform and record.  In the 1990s and 2000s, a number of young musicians emerged, including US pianists Brad Mehldau, Jason Moran and  Vijay Iyer, guitarist Kurt Rosenwinkel,  vibraphonist Stefon Harris, trumpeters Roy Hargrove and Terence Blanchard, saxophonists Chris Potter and Joshua Redman, and bassist Christian McBride.

2000

Events

January
 28 – The 3rd Polarjazz started in Longyearbyen, Svalbard (February 28 – 30).

April
 14 – The 27th Vossajazz started in Voss, Norway (April 14 – 16).

May
 10 – The 11th MaiJazz started in Stavanger, Norway (May 10 – 14).
 25 – The 28th Nattjazz started in Bergen, Norway (May 25 – June 3).

June
 9 – The 29th Moers Festival started in Moers, Germany (June 9 – 12).
 13 – The 10th Jazz Fest Wien started in Wien, Austria (June 13 – July 9).
 29 – The 21st Montreal International Jazz Festival started in Montreal, Quebec, Canada (June 29 – July 9).

July
 5 – The 37th Kongsberg Jazzfestival started in Kongsberg, Norway (July 5 – 8).
 7 – The 34th Montreux Jazz Festival started in Montreux, Switzerland (July 7 – 22).
 11 – The 53rd Nice Jazz Festival started in Nice, France (July 11 – 18).
 14
 The 25th North Sea Jazz Festival started in The Hague (July 14 – 16).
 The 35th Pori Jazz started in Pori, Finland (July 14 – 23).
 17 – The 40th Moldejazz started in Molde, Norway (July 17 – 22).
 21 – The 35th San Sebastian Jazz Festival started in San Sebastian, Spain (July 21 – 26).

August
 9 – The 14th Sildajazz started in Haugesund, Norway (August 9 – 13).
 11
 The 46th Newport Jazz Festival started in Newport, Rhode Island (August 11 – 13).
 The 15th Oslo Jazzfestival started in Oslo, Norway (August 11–19).
 13 – The 17th Brecon Jazz Festival started in Brecon, Wales (August 13 – 15).

September
 15 – The 43rd Monterey Jazz Festival started in Monterey, California (September 15 – 17).

October
 12 – The DølaJazz started in Lillehammer, Norway (October 12 – 15).

November
 2 – The Trondheim Jazz Festival started in Trondheim, Norway (November 2 – 5).
 15 – The 9th London Jazz Festival started in London, England (November 15 – 24).

Album releases

 Pat Metheny: Trio 99 → 00 (Warner Bros.)
 Joshua Redman: Beyond (Warner Bros.)
 Parker / Guy / Lytton and Marilyn Crispell: After Appleby (Leo Records)
 Branford Marsalis Quartet: Contemporary Jazz (Columbia)
 Dave Douglas: El Trilogy (BMG)
 Guillermo Gregorio: Faktura (Hat[now]Art)
 Pat Metheny: Trio → Live (Warner Bros.)
 Joe Maneri: Going To Church (AUM Fidelity)
 Marilyn Crispell: Red (Black Saint)
 Myra Melford: Dance Beyond the Color (Arabesque)
 The Rippingtons: Life in the Tropics (Peak)
 Spring Heel Jack: Disappeared (Thirsty Ear)
 Pat Metheny & The Heath Brothers + Ralph Towner & Charlie Haden: Move To The Groove (West Wind)
 World Saxophone Quartet: Requiem for Julius (Justin Time)
 Terence Blanchard: Wandering Moon (Sony Classical)
 Misha Mengelberg: Solo (BUZZ Records)
 Bill Dixon: Papyrus Volume I (Soul Note)
 Bill Dixon: Papyrus Volume II (Soul Note)
 Marty Ehrlich's Traveler's Tales: Malinke's Dance (OmniTone)
 Magni Wentzel: Porgy and Bess (Hot Club)
 Olga Konkova Trio: Northern Crossings (Candid)
 Hugh Masekela: Sixty (Shanachie)

Deaths

 January
 2 – Nat Adderley, American trumpeter (born 1931).
 4 – Roger Frampton, Australian pianist, saxophonist, composer, and educator (born 1948).
 16 – Gene Harris, American pianist (born 1933).
 20 – Don Abney, American pianist (born 1923).
 25 – Lin Halliday, American saxophonist (born 1936).
 31 – Si Zentner, American trombonist and big-band leader (born 1917).

 February
 15 – Gus Johnson, American drummer (born 1913).
 29 – Hidehiko Matsumoto, Japanese saxophonist and bandleader (born 1926).

 March
 6 – Ole Jacob Hansen, Norwegian drummer (born 1940).
 13 – Cab Kaye, English singer and pianist (born 1921).
 18 – Randi Hultin, Norwegian jazz critic and impresario (born 1926).
 24 – Al Grey, American trombonist (born 1925).

 April
 13 – Pete Minger, American trumpeter (born 1943).
 29 – Jonah Jones, American trumpeter (born 1909)

 May
 2
 Billy Munn, British pianist and arranger (born 1911).
 Teri Thornton, American singer (born 1934).
 21 – Buzzy Drootin, American drummer (born 1920).
 31 – Tito Puente, American drummer, songwriter, and record producer (born 1923).

 June
 3 – Glenn Horiuchi, American jazz pianist, composer, and shamisen player (born 1955).
 7 – Clint Houston, American upright bassist (born 1946).
 12 – Bruno Martino, Italian jazz composer, singer, and pianist (born 1925).
 22 – Svein Finnerud, Norwegian pianist, painter, and graphic artist (born 1945).
 23 – Jerome Richardson, American saxophonist and flautist (born 1920).
 25 – Wilson Simonal, Brazilian singer (born 1938).

 July
 6 – Akira Miyazawa, Japanese saxophonist, clarinetist, and flautist (born 1927).

 August
 14 – Walter Benton, American tenor saxophonist (born 1930).
 20 – Chris Columbus, American drummer (born 1902).
 25 – Jack Nitzsche, American musician, arranger, songwriter, record producer, and film score composer (born 1937).

 September
 12 – Stanley Turrentine, American tenor saxophonist (born 1934).
 22 – Willie Cook, American trumpeter (born 1923).
 26
 Baden Powell, Brazilian guitarist and composer (born 1937).
 Nick Fatool, American drummer (born 1915).

 October
 6 – Pat Flowers, American pianist and singer (born 1917).
 11 – Sture Nordin, Swedish upright bassist (born 1933).
 13 – Britt Woodman, American trombonist (born 1920).
 18 – Julie London, American singer and actress (born 1926).
 25 – Jeanne Lee, American singer, poet, and composer (born 1939).
 30 – Steve Allen, American singer, songwriter, and television personality (born 1921).

 November
 4 – Vernel Fournier, American drummer (born 1928).
 8 – Dick Morrissey, British saxophonist and composer (born 1908).

 December
 1
 George Finola, American cornetist (born 1945).
 Neal Creque, American organist and composer (born 1940).
 12 – Rosa King, American saxophonist and singer (born 1939).

2001

Album releases
 Michael Brecker: Nearness Of You: The Ballad Book (Verve)
 Diana Krall: The Look of Love (Verve)
 Gordon Goodwin's Big Phat Band: Swingin' For The Fences (Silverline)
 Herbie Hancock: Future 2 Future (Transparent, Columbia)
 Gordon Haskell: Look Out (Flying Sparks)
 The Idea of North: The Sum of Us (Magnetic Records)
 Robbie Williams: Swing When You're Winning (Capitol)
 James Morrison: Scream Machine (Morrison Records)
 World Saxophone Quartet: 25th Anniversary: The New Chapter (Justin Time)
 Marilyn Crispell: Blue (Black Saint)
 Matthew Shipp: Expansion Power Release (hatOLOGY)
 Olga Konkova Trio: Some Things From Home (Candid)

Deaths
 Moses Taiwa Molelekwa (17 April 1973 – 13 February), South African pianist
 John Lewis (May 3, 1920 – March 29), American pianist, composer and arranger

2002

Events

January
 25 – The 5th Polarjazz started in Longyearbyen, Svalbard (January 25 – 27).

March
 22 – The 29th Vossajazz started in Voss, Norway (March 22 – 24).

May
 5 – The 13th MaiJazz started in Stavanger, Norway (May 6 – 10).
 17 – The 30th Moers Festival started in Moers, Germany (May 17 – 20).
 24 – The 30th Nattjazz started in Bergen, Norway (May 24 – June 1).

June
 24 – The 12th Jazz Fest Wien started in Wien, Austria (June 24 – July 7).
 27 – The 23rd Montreal International Jazz Festival started in Montreal, Quebec, Canada (June 27 – July 7).

July
 3 – The 38th Kongsberg Jazzfestival started in Kongsberg, Norway (July 3 – 6).
 5 – The 36th Montreux Jazz Festival started in Montreux, Switzerland (July 5 – 22).
 12 – 27th North Sea Jazz Festival started in The Hague (July 12 – 14).
 13 – 37th Pori Jazz started in Pori, Finland (July 13 – 21).
 15 – The 42nd Moldejazz started in Molde, Norway (July 15 – 20).

August
 5 – The 17th Oslo Jazzfestival started in Oslo, Norway (August 5 – 10).
 7 – The 16th Sildajazz started in Haugesund, Norway (August 7 – 11).
 9
 The 48th Newport Jazz Festival started in Newport, Rhode Island (August 9 – 11).
 The 19th Brecon Jazz Festival started in Brecon, Wales (August 9 – 11).

September
 20 – The 45th Monterey Jazz Festival started in Monterey, California (September 20 – 22).

November
 15 – The 11th London Jazz Festival started in London, England (November 15 – 24).

Album releases
 Norah Jones: Come Away with Me
 Rova Saxophone Quartet: Freedom in Fragments (Composed by Fred Frith)
 Herbie Hancock: Directions in Music: Live at Massey Hall, live album with Michael Brecker and Roy Hargrove
 Gordon Haskell: Harry's Bar
 Kenny Garrett: Happy People
 James Morrison: So Far So Good
 Wayne Shorter: Footprints Live!
 World Saxophone Quartet: Steppenwolf (Justin Time)
 Fred Frith and Maybe Monday: Digital Wildlife (Winter & Winter)
 Kausland/Mathisen Quartet: Good Bait (Hot Club)
 Hugh Masekela: Time (Sony Music Distribution)

Deaths

 January 
 21 – Peggy Lee, American singer, songwriter, composer, and actress (born 1920).

 February
 1 – Streamline Ewing, American trombonist (born 1917).
 2 – Remo Palmier, American guitarist (born 1923).
 6 – Wendell Marshall, American upright bassist (born 1920).
 8 – Nick Brignola, American baritone saxophonist (born 1936).
 10 – Dave Van Ronk, American folk singer (born 1936).
 22 – Ronnie Verrell, English drummer (born 1926).
 24 – Mel Stewart, American character actor, television director, and saxophonist (born 1929).
 28 – Helmut Zacharias, German violinist and composer (born 1920).

 March
 10 – Shirley Scott, African-American organist (born 1934).
 19 – John Patton, American pianist and organist (born 1935).
 27 – Dudley Moore, English actor, comedian, pianist, and composer (born 1935).

 April
 8 – Wilber Morris, American upright bassist and bandleader (born 1937).
 9 – Weldon Irvine, American composer, playwright, poet, pianist, organist, and keyboardist (born 1943).
 11 – Bubba Brooks, American tenor saxophonist (born 1922).
 16 – Claudio Slon, Brazilian drummer (born 1943).
 18 – Cy Laurie, English clarinetist and bandleader (born 1926).
 29
 Noel DaCosta, Nigerian-Jamaican composer, violinist, and choral conductor (born 1929).
 Pete Jacobsen, English pianist (born 1950).

 May
 6 – Bjørn Johansen, Norwegian saxophonist (born 1940).
 12 – Bob Berg, American saxophonist (born 1951).
 24 – Susie Garrett, African-American actress, vocalist, and acting teacher (born 1929).

 June
 5
 Curtis Amy, American tenor saxophonist (born 1929).
 Truck Parham, American upright bassist (born 1911).
 27
 Russ Freeman, American pianist and composer (born 1926).
 Chico O'Farrill, Cuban composer, arranger, and conductor (born 1921).

 July
 2 – Ray Brown, American upright bassist (born 1926).
 20 – Jimmy Maxwell, American trumpeter (born 1917).
 22 – Marion Montgomery, American singer (born 1934).
 25 – Idrees Sulieman, American trumpeter and alto saxophonist (born 1923).

 August
 2 – Roy Kral, American pianist and vocalist (born 1921).
 31 – Lionel Hampton, American vibraphonist (born 1908).

 September
 5 – Frank Hewitt, American hard bop pianist (born 1935).
 17 – Dodo Marmarosa, American pianist, composer, and arranger (born 1925).
 21 – Peter Kowald, German upright bassist and tubist (born 1944).
 30 – Ellis Larkins, American pianist (born 1923).

 October
 17
 Chuck Domanico, American bassist (born 1944).
 Henri Renaud, French jazz pianist and record company executive (born 1925).

 November
 3 – Lonnie Donegan, Scottish skiffle singer, songwriter, and guitarist (born 1931).
 13
 Bill Berry, American trumpeter, Duke Ellington Orchestra (born 1930).
 Roland Hanna, American pianist, composer, and teacher (born 1932).
 16 – Mose Vinson, American pianist and singer (born 1917).
 20 – Webster Lewis, American keyboardist (born 1943).
 21 – Hadda Brooks, American pianist, vocalist, and composer (born 1916).
 27
 John McLevy, Scottish trumpeter (born 1927).
 Stanley Black, English bandleader, composer, conductor, arranger and pianist (born 1913).

 December
 2 – Mal Waldron, American pianist, composer, and arranger (born 1925).
 5 – Arvell Shaw, American upright bassist (born 1923).
 7 – Clare Deniz, British pianist (born 1911).
 11 – Lou Stein, American pianist (born 1922).
 13 – Stella Brooks, American singer (born 1910).

2003

Album releases
 Michael Brecker: Wide Angles
 Michael Franks: Watching the Snow 
 Kenny Garrett: Standard of Language
 Gordon Goodwin's Big Phat Band: XXL
 The Idea of North: Here & Now
 James Morrison: On The Edge (with Simon Stockhausen)
 Mike Nock: Changing Seasons with Brett Hirst and Toby Hall
 The Rippingtons: Let It Ripp
 Wayne Shorter: Alegria
 Amy Winehouse: Frank
 Tord Gustavsen Trio: Changing Places (ECM)

Deaths
 Nina Simone (February 21, 1933 – April 21), American singer

2004

Album releases
 Jamie Cullum: Twentysomething
 Fourplay: Journey
 The Idea of North: Evidence
 Norah Jones: Feels Like Home
 Diana Krall: The Girl in the Other Room
 Mike Nock: Duologue (Birdland, 2004) live concert recording with Dave Liebman
 Ben Sidran: Nick's Bump 
 World Saxophone Quartet: Experience (Justin Time)
 Gordon Haskell: The Lady Wants To Know

Deaths
 Ray Charles (September 23, 1930 – June 10), American singer, pianist and composer
 Bjørnar Andresen (April 1, 1945 – October 2), Norwegian upright bassist
 Artie Shaw (May 23, 1910 – December 30), American clarinetist

2005

Album releases
 Herbie Hancock: Possibilities
 Diana Krall: Christmas Songs
 James Morrison: Gospel Collection
 The Rippingtons: Wild Card
 Wayne Shorter: Beyond the Sound Barrier
 Tord Gustavsen Trio: The Ground (ECM)
 Hans Mathisen: Quiet Songs (Curling Legs)

Deaths
 Pierre Michelot (March 3, 1928 – July 3), French upright-bassist

2006

Album releases
 Eddie Daniels: Brief Encounter (Muse, 2006)
 Michael Franks: Rendezvous in Rio 
 Gordon Goodwin's Big Phat Band: The Phat Pack
 The Idea of North: The Gospel Project 
 Diana Krall: From This Moment On
 James Morrison: Gospel Collection Volume II
 James Morrison: 2x2 with Joe Chindamo
 The Rippingtons: 20th Anniversary
 World Saxophone Quartet: Political Blues (Justin Time)
 Olga Konkova and Per Mathisen: Unbound (Alessa)

Deaths
 Lou Rawls (December 1, 1933 – January 6), American singer
 Maynard Ferguson (May 4, 1928 – August 23), American trumpet player, composer
 Ruth Brown (January 12, 1928 – November 17), American singer, actress
 Anita O'Day (October 18, 1919 – November 23), American singer
 Jay McShann (January 12, 1916 – December 7), American pianist
 Kenneth Sivertsen (January 16, 1961 – December 24), Norwegian guitarist, composer, and entertainer

Births
 Angelina Jordan (January 10), Norwegian singer.

2007

Album releases
 Michael Brecker: Pilgrimage
 Herbie Hancock: River: The Joni Letters
 The Idea of North: Live at the Powerhouse (CD and DVD)
 James Morrison: The Other Woman with Deni Hines
 James Morrison: Christmas
 Tord Gustavsen Trio: Being There (ECM)

Deaths
 Michael Brecker (March 29, 1949 – January 13), American tenor saxophonist, composer
 Al Viola (June 16, 1919 – February 21), American guitarist
 Art Davis (December 5, 1934 – July 29), American upright-bassist
 Max Roach (January 10, 1924 – August 16), American drummer, percussionist, and composer
 Joe Zawinul (July 7, 1932 – September 11), Austrian keyboardist and composer
 Specs Powell (June 5, 1922 – September 15), American drummer and percussionist
 Teresa Brewer (May 7, 1931 – October 17), American singer
 Joel Dorn (April 7, 1942 – December 17), American music producer and record label entrepreneur
 Oscar Peterson (August 15, 1925 – December 23), Canadian pianist

2008

Album releases
 Gordon Goodwin's Big Phat Band: Act Your Age
 Steve Tyrell: Back to Bacharach

Deaths
 Esbjörn Svensson (April 16, 1964 – June 14), Swedish pianist and bandleader of Esbjörn Svensson Trio
 Cachao (September 14, 1918 – March 22), Cuban upright-bassist
 Earle Hagen (July 9, 1919 – May 26), American composer
 LeRoi Moore (September 7, 1961 – August 19), American saxophonist
 Bheki Mseleku (March 3, 1955 – September 9), South African pianist
 Richard Wright (July 28, 1943 – September 15), English keyboarder, composer, singer and songwriter
 Merl Saunders (February 14, 1934 – October 24), American  pianist and keyboardist
 Miriam Makeba (March 4, 1932 – November 9), South African singer

2009

Album releases
 Diana Krall: Quiet Nights
 The Rippingtons: Modern Art
 Ben Sidran: Dylan Different 
 Tord Gustavsen Ensemble: Restored, Returned (ECM)
 Olga Konkova: Improvisational Four (Candid)

Deaths
 David "Fathead" Newman (February 24, 1933 – January 20), American saxophonist
 Gerry Niewood (April 6, 1943 – February 12), American saxophonist
 Blossom Dearie (April 28, 1924 – February 7), American singer and pianist
 Coleman Mellett (May 27, 1974 – February 12), American guitarist
 Koko Taylor (September 28, 1928 – June 3), American singer
 Kenny Rankin (February 10, 1940 – June 7), American singer and composer
 Tina Marsh (January 18, 1954 – June 16), American singer and composer

See also

 List of years in jazz
 2000 in music

References

External links
 History Of Jazz Timeline: 2000 at All About Jazz

 
2000s in music
21st century in jazz
Jazz by decade
Jazz